Xabier González Elorriaga (born April 1, 1944 in Maracaibo) is a Spanish film and TV actor, writer and director.

Biography 
His exiled parents returned to Bilbao in Spain, in 1969 where he commenced studying Law, Engineering and the Merchant Marine but soon switched to the theatre, becoming well known as an actor in the Bilbao of the 1970s. He then moved to Barcelona where he studied journalism and worked in the university.  He made his prize-winning film debut in 1975 with La ciudad cremada and he has subsequently appeared in over 50 films.

A number of these have been released internationally in English, including:
 The Dancer Upstairs (Pasos de baile, 2002)
 To Love Too Much (Demasiado amor, 2002)
 My Mother Likes Women (A mi madre le gustan las mujeres, 2002)
 Sleeping Beauties (Bellas Durmientes, 2001, English subtitles)
 Thesis (Tesis, 1996)
 To the Four Winds (A los cuatro vientos, 1987)
 The Secret Garden (El jardín secreto, 1984)
 Man of Fashion (El hombre de moda,  1980)
 Blindfolded Eyes (Los ojos vendados,  1978)
 The Burned City  (La ciudad quemada,  1976)

Together with Arantxa Urretavizcaya, he is credited with the screenplay of Zorrilla's A los cuatro vientos (1987).
He directed the short film Ikuska 4 (1980).

His TV work includes the series Anillos de oro, Clase media, and La verdad de Laura. He has made episodic appearances in Telecinco's Hospital Central and was involved with TVE-1's miniseries Las Cerezas del Cementerio.

Prizes
1977 CEC Prize for A un dios desconocido
1976 CEC Prize for La ciudad quemada

Selected filmography

External links

 Xabier Elorriaga on Nuestrocine (in Spanish)

1944 births
Living people
People from Maracaibo
University of Deusto alumni
20th-century Venezuelan male actors
Venezuelan people of Basque descent
Venezuelan emigrants to Spain
21st-century Venezuelan male actors
Venezuelan male film actors
Venezuelan male stage actors
Venezuelan male television actors
Basque-language actors
Spanish film actors